Fransisca Ratnasari Hari Saputra (born 2 October 1986) is an Indonesian retired badminton player.

Personal life 
Fransisca Ratnasari Hari Saputra was born as the youngest daughter of four children of Petrus Haryanto and M. Kasiyem family. She went to Caritas Nandan Catholic Elementary School until she graduated in 1997. She then continue her education in SMPN 5 (Number 5 National Junior High School) of Yogyakarta but only lasted for 2 months because she decided to focus on her badminton career. She is now still registered as a student in STIE (School of Economics) PERBANAS Jakarta. After retired from the badminton, she continued studying at the Sanata Dharma University majoring in English literature.

Career 
"Nana", as people called her, started playing badminton at 8 years old. She went to Jaya Raya Jakarta club at 13 years old. In 2003, she was selected for the Indonesia national badminton team and in 2004, she was part of the Indonesian Uber Cup squad. At the Indonesia Open, Nana defeated Pi Hongyan from France in the 3rd round. At the Japan Open, Nana advanced to the quarterfinals. At the 2005 Sudirman Cup, Nana helped the Indonesian team to reach the final round after she defeated Camilla Sørensen from Denmark.

At the 2006 Asian Games, Nana beat Thillini Jayasinghe on the round of 32. But she lost to China's famous Zhang Ning in the round of 16. In 2007, she competed at the 2007 Summer Universiade in Bangkok, Thailand. At the 2008 Uber Cup, Nana was Indonesia's fourth women's singles player and was kept out of the matches. The Indonesian team reached the final but was defeated by China. In early January 2009, Nana had been dropped out from the national training center due to the reformization of PBSI under new chairman. She then moved to new club PB Djarum and play under Djarum name.

Achievements

BWF Grand Prix (1 title, 2 runners-up) 
The BWF Grand Prix had two levels, the Grand Prix and Grand Prix Gold. It was a series of badminton tournaments sanctioned by the Badminton World Federation (BWF) and played between 2007 and 2017. The World Badminton Grand Prix was sanctioned by the International Badminton Federation from 1983 to 2006.

Women's singles

  BWF Grand Prix Gold tournament
  BWF & IBF Grand Prix tournament

BWF International Challenge/Series (3 titles, 3 runners-up) 
Women's singles

  BWF International Challenge tournament
  BWF International Series tournament

References

External links 
 

1986 births
Living people
People from Sleman Regency
Sportspeople from Special Region of Yogyakarta
Indonesian female badminton players
Badminton players at the 2006 Asian Games
Asian Games competitors for Indonesia
Competitors at the 2003 Southeast Asian Games
Competitors at the 2005 Southeast Asian Games
Southeast Asian Games bronze medalists for Indonesia
Southeast Asian Games medalists in badminton
Universiade bronze medalists for Indonesia
Universiade medalists in badminton
Medalists at the 2007 Summer Universiade
21st-century Indonesian women